Luis Bustamante may refer to:

Luis Bustamante (footballer) (born 1985), Argentine professional football player
Luis Bustamante (baseball) (b. 1880), Cuban baseball player
José Luís Varela Bustamente (born 1978), Venezuelan professional boxer